Clarendon is a municipality in the Outaouais region, part of the Pontiac Regional County Municipality, Quebec, Canada. It is located on the north shore of the Ottawa River across from Horton Township in Ontario.

Its settlements include Clarendon, North Clarendon, Charteris, Lawn, Murrell, Radford, Sand Bay, Starks Corners, and Yarm. The town of Shawville is surrounded by, but not part of, Clarendon.

The only notable lake is Green Lake, which is surrounded by cottages.

History
The township was first surveyed in 1792 and appears on the Gale and Duberger map of 1795. Settlement did not occur until 1825 when James Prendergast, a retired British Army Officer, was commissioned by the government to lead this task. From that year until 1827, free land was granted, resulting in a wave of settlers, starting with 15 settlers near the township's centre (now Shawville). But Prendergast, originally from religiously-divided Ireland, stipulated that settlers only be Protestants in order to avoid similar religious strife. As a result, Clarendon (and Shawville) is known as the heartland of Anglo-Saxon Protestantism in western Quebec.

Between 1827 and 1835, Prendergast was responsible for establishing the first four schools and bringing in its teachers. He also built a water-driven sawmill and grist mill at his home along the Ottawa River.

In 1833, the Township of Clarendon was officially established. It was named after Clarendon Park, near Salisbury in Wiltshire, England (where Henry II had convened peers and bishops to formulate the Constitutions of Clarendon in 1164). In 1837, the post office opened. From then on and into the 1840s, when the timber industry started to prosper, a second wave of settlement occurred, doubling the population of Clarendon between 1840 and 1850.

In 1855, the Township Municipality of Clarendon was created.  This status was reformed to Municipality of Clarendon on October 11, 2003.

Demographics

Population

Language
Mother tongue:
 English as first language: 82%
 French as first language: 14%
 Other languages: 1.4%

See also
 List of municipalities in Quebec

References

External links

Incorporated places in Outaouais
Municipalities in Quebec
Populated places established in 1825